Foraker is an unincorporated community in Union Township, Elkhart County, Indiana.

Geography
The town spreads south and west from the corner of CR 142 and CR 13.

History
Foraker was founded in 1892 when the Wabash Railroad was extended to that point. It was named for Joseph B. Foraker, the 37th Governor of Ohio.

The Foraker post office was discontinued in 1966.

References

Unincorporated communities in Elkhart County, Indiana
Unincorporated communities in Indiana